Eden Taylor-Draper (born 28 October 1997) is an English actress. She portrays Belle Dingle in the ITV soap opera Emmerdale, a role she took over from Emily Mather in 2005.

Career
In 2005, at the age of eight, Taylor-Draper was cast in the role of Belle Dingle in the ITV soap opera Emmerdale, taking over from the previous portrayer, Emily Mather. One of Taylor-Draper's notable storylines in Emmerdale was when Belle fell down a mineshaft on Christmas Day 2005. Alongside Luke Tittensor, she won the Spectacular Scene of the Year award at the 2006 British Soap Awards for this storyline. In 2007, at the age of nine, she appeared in the short film The Cardiac Oak. In 2013, she won the award for Best Young Performance at the British Soap Awards.

Personal life
On 11 September 2016, alongside her Emmerdale co-star Matthew Wolfenden, Taylor-Draper took part in the Great North Run to raise funds for Bloodwise. Since 2016, she has been in a relationship with Ed Lewis.

Filmography

Awards and nominations

References

External links
 

1997 births
Actresses from Yorkshire
English child actresses
English film actresses
English soap opera actresses
Living people
People from Selby